Cedar Street Recreation Center, also known as the Jasper G. Hayes Omega Center, is a historic community center building located at New Bern, Craven County, North Carolina, United States.  It was built between 1948 and 1952, and is located in a historically African-American section of New Bern.  It consists of a one-story, 110-foot-by-91-foot, concrete-block main block with a 30-foot-by-91-foot wing.  The building is in the Modern style.  It was initially used as a recreational center and basketball arena for the African-American youth of the community and later as a venue for neighborhood gatherings and social events.

It was listed on the National Register of Historic Places in 2003.

References

African-American history of North Carolina
Sports venues on the National Register of Historic Places in North Carolina
Modern Movement architecture in the United States
Buildings and structures completed in 1952
Buildings and structures in New Bern, North Carolina
National Register of Historic Places in Craven County, North Carolina
1952 establishments in North Carolina